Melville Louis Kossuth "Melvil" Dewey (December 10, 1851 – December 26, 1931) was an influential American librarian and educator, inventor of the Dewey Decimal system of library classification, a founder of the Lake Placid Club, and a chief librarian at Columbia University. He was also a founding member of the American Library Association but resigned in 1905, due to allegations of sexual harassment, racism, and antisemitism.

Education and personal life 
Dewey was born on December 10, 1851, in Adams Center, New York, the fifth and last child of Joel and Eliza Greene Dewey. He attended rural schools and determined early on that his destiny was to reform education of the masses.
He briefly attended Alfred University (1870), then Amherst College, where he belonged to Delta Kappa Epsilon, and from which he earned a bachelor's degree in 1874 and a master's in 1877.

While still a student, he founded the Library Bureau, which sold high-quality index-cards and filing-cabinets, and established the standard dimensions for catalog cards.

As a young adult he advocated spelling reform; he changed his name from the usual "Melville" to "Melvil", without redundant letters, and for a time changed his surname to "Dui."

From 1883 to 1888 he was chief librarian at the Columbia University Libraries. During his time as director of the New York State Library (1888–1906) Dewey established a program of traveling libraries. From 1888 to 1900 he served as secretary and executive officer of the University of the State of New York.

In 1895, Dewey founded the Lake Placid Club with his wife Annie. He and his son Godfrey had been active in arranging the Winter Olympics which took place at Lake Placid—he chaired the New York State Winter Olympics Committee. In 1926 he went to Florida to establish a new branch of the Lake Placid Club.

Dewey married twice, first to Annie R. Godfrey, and then to Emily McKay Beal. He and his first wife had one child, Godfrey. Dewey became a member of the American Library Association's Hall of Fame in 1951.

He died of a stroke in Lake Placid, Florida.

Work 
Dewey was a pioneer in American librarianship and an influential figure in the development of libraries in America in the late 19th and early 20th century. He is best known for the decimal classification system that many public and school libraries use.  Among his other innovations was the idea of a state library operating as the controller of the state's school and public library services.  In Boston, Massachusetts, he founded the Library Bureau, a private company "for the definite purpose of furnishing libraries with equipment and supplies of unvarying correctness and reliability." Its investigative unit, devoted to studying the best practices of library loss-management, circulation and data retention, recovered 3,000 books in its first year of existence.

Dewey's Library Bureau company is also said to have introduced hanging vertical files, first seen at the Columbian Exposition of 1893 in Chicago. In 1905, Dewey established the American Library Institute which was an organization conceived to provide for the investigation, study and discussion of issues within the field of library theory and practice.

Dewey Decimal Classification 

Immediately after receiving his undergraduate degree he was hired to manage Amherst's library and reclassify its collections. Dewey worked out a new scheme that superimposed a system of decimal numbers on a structure of knowledge first outlined by Sir Francis Bacon. For his decision to use a decimal system, he may have been inspired by two library systems that he includes in the acknowledgements in the first publication of his system in 1876. In that preface, and in the following thirteen editions, Dewey cites the card system of Italian publisher Natale Battezzati as "the most fruitful source of ideas".

Dewey copyrighted the system in 1876. This system has proved to be enormously influential; though many American libraries have since adopted the classification scheme of the Library of Congress, Dewey's system remains in widespread use.

American Library Association 
In 1876, Dewey moved to Boston, where he founded and became editor of The Library Journal, which became an influential factor in the development of libraries in America, and in the reform of their administration. He was also one of the founders of the American Library Association, of which he was secretary from 1876 to 1891, and president in 1891 and 1893.

School of Library Economy 

In 1883, Dewey replaced Beverly R. Betts as librarian of Columbia College, and in the following year founded there the School of Library Economy, the first institution for the instruction of librarians ever organized. The proposal to establish the school was approved by the college's Board of Trustees on May 5, 1884. After a period of preparation, the school was officially opened on January 5, 1887, with an enrollment of 20 students—three men and 17 women. Women were admitted to the program at Dewey's insistence and against the wishes of the college's Regents. Although the school had a promising start, Dewey's conflicts with the university officials, in particular over the issue of the presence of women, led to its future being cast in doubt, and by 1888 it was apparent that Columbia intended to close it.

However, at that point, Dewey, upon accepting a position with the New York State Library in Albany, successfully secured the agreement of its Regents to have the school transferred there. The formal transfer was accomplished in 1889, and the school, which was ultimately very successful, was re-established in Albany as the New York State Library School under Dewey's direction. The school returned to Columbia's Manhattan campus in 1926. Dewey did not forget his Columbia students. He petitioned the University of the State of New York, which granted degrees to those students who agreed to submit to examinations and produce a bibliography and thesis. Two students participated, including future ALA registrar and college archivist Nina Browne.

During the period from 1888 to 1906 Dewey was also director of the New York State Library, and until 1900 he was secretary of the University of the State of New York as well. In that function he completely reorganized the state library, making it one of the most efficient in America, and established the system of state travelling libraries and picture collections. In 1885, he founded the New York Library Club there.

Traveling libraries 
Community libraries began to flourish in the early nineteenth century. The western United States opened to expansion and further exploration, and people wanted services and opportunities to move with them.  In New York, Melvil Dewey had "initiated a program of traveling libraries-collections of one hundred books sent to communities without public libraries." His efforts spurred other state organizations and private individuals to create traveling libraries. Increased library services to small or rural communities and underserved populations fortified the efforts of many to seek out education and self-improvement.

Metric system advocacy 
As an enthusiastic supporter of the decimal metric system of weights and measures, Dewey established in 1876 the American Metric Bureau.
Dewey also served once again as its secretary. He edited the Bureau's official publication, the Metric Bulletin (later called Metric Advocate), first issued in July 1876. Later in his life he was member of the advisory board of the All-America Standards Council (a California-based organization that promoted metrication for all countries in the Americas) and he functioned as member of the advisory board and chairman of the Metric Education Committee in the American Metric Association (today the U.S. Metric Association).

Lake Placid Club and other reforms
 Late in his life Dewey helped found the Lake Placid Club as a health resort in New York state.

His theories of spelling reform (to which end he founded the Spelling Reform Association in 1886) found some local success at Lake Placid: there is an "Adirondak Loj" in the area, and dinner menus of the club used his reformed spelling. A September 1927 menu is headed "Simpler spelin" and features dishes like hadok, poted beef with noodls, parsli or masht potato, butr, steamd rys, letis, and ys cream. It also advises guests that "All shud see the butiful after-glo on mountains to the east just before sunset. Fyn vu from Golfhous porch."

Lake Placid also acted as a conference center hosting meetings promoting reform movements, such as the September 1899 conference on "home science" chaired by Ellen Swallow Richards, a pioneer of what later came to be called "home economics".

Dewey was an early promoter of winter sports in Lake Placid and was active in arranging the 1932 Winter Olympics there. He was also a founder of the Lake Placid Club Education Foundation in 1922. Under his leadership, the Northwood School (Lake Placid, New York) prospered. He was also a founder of the Adirondack Music Festival in 1925, and served as a trustee of the Chautauqua Institution.

In 1926, he established a southern branch of the Lake Placid Club in Florida. Dewey supported the idea of Lake Stearns in Florida formally changing its name to Lake Placid, Florida.

Controversies 
Dewey established a pattern of making powerful enemies early in life, and many of his friends found him difficult as well. As one biographer put it, "Although he did not lack friends, they were becoming a little weary of coming to his defense, so endless a process had it become."

Sexual harassment 
Another biography refers to Dewey's "old nemesis—a persistent inability to control himself around women" as a chronic cause of trouble on the job. For decades, Dewey refused to stop his  "unwelcome hugging, unwelcome touching, certainly unwelcome kissing" with female subordinates and others, according to biographer Wayne A. Wiegand. When Dewey opened his School of Library Economy at Columbia College to women, it was rumored that he asked for their bust sizes with their applications. Though the rumor turned out to be false, he did require a photograph from each female applicant since "you cannot polish a pumpkin".

In 1905, during a 10-day trip to Alaska sponsored by the American Library Association (ALA), a group he co-founded, he made unwelcome advances on four prominent librarians who informed Association officials. As a result, Dewey was forced to step down from active participation in the ALA as several of his colleagues added their voices to a campaign.  After 1906, Dewey was no longer an active ALA member but he was still invited to be the guest of honor at ALA's 50th anniversary meeting in 1926. Reports, allegations, and an investigation of Dewey's inappropriate and offensive behavior directed at women continued for decades after his departure from ALA. "In exchange for a quiet departure, he was spared an ugly and public expose of one of his major flaws", Wiegand writes. "He was never again a power player in ALA politics."In 1929, Dewey settled out of court for $2,147 for a lawsuit brought by a former stenographer, whom he had kissed and caressed in public the previous summer. In general, Dewey himself did not deny his actions—only their impropriety. "I have been very unconventional ... as men [are] always who frankly show and speak of their liking for women", he wrote. But, he insisted, it was not his fault if the targets of his "unconventional" actions took offense: "Pure women would understand my ways."

Antisemitism and racism 
The Lake Placid Club banned Jews, blacks, and others from membership, a policy written by Dewey. Out of fear, Dewey bought the land adjacent to the Lake Placid Club to prevent Jews from purchasing it. In 1904, the New York State Board of Regents received a petition demanding Dewey's removal as state librarian because of his personal involvement in the Lake Placid Club's policy of excluding Jews and other religious and ethnic groups. While the regents declined to remove Dewey, they did issue a public rebuke, and in the summer of 1905 he resigned as a result.

American Library Association medal
At the June 2019 conference of the American Library Association, the Council voted to remove Dewey's name from its top honor, the Melvil Dewey Medal; the resolution cited Dewey's history of racism, anti-Semitism, and sexual harassment.  The resolution was passed overwhelmingly with no debate. The award was renamed the ALA Medal of Excellence at the Association's January 2020 conference.

Selected publications 
 1876: Classification and subject index for cataloguing and arranging the books and pamphlets of a library,  Hartford, Conn.: Case, Lockwood, & Brainard Company.
 1885: Decimal classification and relativ [sic] index for arranging, cataloguing, and indexing public and private libraries and for pamphlets, clippings, notes, scrap books, index rerums, etc. (2nd edition) Boston: Library Bureau.
 1886: Librarianship as a profession for college-bred women. An address delivered before the Association of collegiate alumnæ, on March 13, 1886, by Melvil Dewey. Boston: Library Bureau.
 1887: Library notes: improved methods and labor-savers for librarians, readers and writers. Boston: Library Bureau.
 1895: Abridged decimal classification and relative index for libraries. Boston: Library Bureau.
 1898: Simplified library school rules. Boston, London [etc.]: Library Bureau.
 1889: Libraries as related to the educational work of the state. Albany.
 1890: Statistics of libraries in the state of New York numbering over 300 volumes. Albany.
 1890: Library school rules: 1. Card catalog rules; 2. Accession book rules; 3. Shelf list rules.
 1904: A.L.A. catalog  Washington: Government Printing Office.

See also
Public library advocacy

References

Further reading 
 George Grosvenor Dawe (1932).  Melvil Dewey, Seer: Inspirer: Doer, 1851–1931. Lake Placid Club, N.Y.: Melvil Dewey Biography.
 Wayne A. Wiegand (1996). Irrepressible Reformer: A Biography of Melvil Dewey.  Chicago: American Library Association.

External links 

 
 
 
 
 Library Bureau founded by Dewey in 1876.
 Children of the Code – Dewey on Spelling Reform (including online video excerpts)
 New York Public Library. Portraits of Dewey
 

 

1851 births
1931 deaths
Alfred University alumni
American librarians
American magazine editors
Amherst College alumni
Columbia University people
English-language spelling reform advocates
Metrication in the United States
People from Adams, New York
People from Boston
People from Highlands County, Florida
Presidents of the American Library Association
Columbia University librarians